Rich Man, Poor Man Book II is an American television miniseries that aired on ABC in one-hour episodes at 9:00pm ET/PT on Tuesday nights between September 21, 1976 and March 8, 1977. A sequel to Rich Man, Poor Man that had aired the previous season, it focused on the further exploits and conflicts of the Jordache family.

Synopsis
The series began shortly after the death of Tom Jordache. His son Wesley (Gregg Henry) is now in the care of Tom's brother Rudy (Peter Strauss), who was seeking a seat in the United States Senate. Also living in the household was Billy, Rudy's stepson, and much of the ongoing storyline concentrated on the tension between the two ambitious boys. Also crucial to the plot was Rudy's protracted battle with Charles Estep (Peter Haskell), the mysterious billionaire owner of Tricorp. Returning from the original series was Anthony Falconetti (William Smith), who had served time for the murder of Tom Jordache and was now free and intent on disposing of Rudy as well.

At the same time, Falconetti firmly intends to eliminate Rudy, Wesley and all the friends of the Jordache family and this time it will not be enough to ignore it to escape him.

CAST SIMILARITIES AND CHANGES: Gregg Henry, as Wesley Jordache, the son of slain Tom Jorache (Nick Nolte) replaced Nick Nolte's character-type, being content with having nothing but still trying to survive while Bill Bixby and Susan Blakely's son Billy, played by James Carroll Jordan, the son-in-law of Peter Strauss's Rudy Jordache, is desperately trying to become rich, like Rudy did in the original (but without much success). 

William Smith as the infamous Anthony Falconetti, who appeared in the last four episodes of the original miniseries' 12 total, is not only one of two (including corporate tycoon Peter Haskell) primary antagonists, but is one of the main characters this time. 

Susan Blakely, the ingenue in the original series, dies early in this sequel, and her leading lady role is shared by Wesley's working class girlfriend Romana, played by Penny Peyser, and Cassie Yates as Annie Adams, a Janis Joplin type up-and-coming singer who Billy is involved with (while he's also secretly involved with Ramona). 

Meanwhile Peter Strauss's Rudy has two love interests: assertive, progressive lawyer Maggie Porter, played by Susan Sullivan (whose underage daughter Jenny Beck becomes involved with Wesley), and, returning from the original, Nick Nolte's widow Kate, played by Kay Lenz. 

So while Peter Strauss as Rudy Jordache is the central character, the titular "Rich Man Poor Man" premise has him overseeing the new young characters, somewhat filling in the shoes of wealthy Strauss and struggling Nolte.

Primary cast

 Peter Strauss . . . Senator Rudy Jordache
 Nick Nolte.....Tom Jordache
 Gregg Henry . . . Wesley Jordache
 Susan Blakely . . . as Julie Prescott
 James Carroll Jordan . . . Billy Abbott
 William Smith . . . as Anthony Falconetti
 Herbert Jefferson Jr. . . . Roy Dwyer
 Kay Lenz . . . Kate Jordache
 Peter Haskell . . . Charles Estep
 Susan Sullivan . . . Maggie Porter
 Kimberly Beck . . . Diane Porter
 Barry Sullivan . . . Senator Paxton
 Laraine Stephens . . . Claire Estep
 John Anderson . . . John Scott
 Penny Peyser . . . Ramona Scott
 Van Johnson . . . Marsh Goodwin
 Ray Milland . . . Duncan Calderwood

 Tim McIntire . . . Brad Knight
 Davey Davison . . . Virginia Calderwood
 Dick Sargent . . . Eddie Heath
 Dimitra Arliss . . . Marie Falconetti
 Cassie Yates . . . Annie Adams
 Sorrell Booke . . . Phil Greenberg
 Colleen Camp . . . Vickie St. John
 Peter Donat . . . Arthur Raymond
 G.D. Spradlin . . . Senator Dillon
 Arthur Franz . . . Senator Jones
 Jason Kincaid . . . Ken Catani
 Ken Swofford . . . Al Barber
 Lynne Randall . . . Lucy
 Larry Kert . . . Danny Miller
 Arlo Guthrie . . . Himself
 Willie Aames . . . Wesley Jordache (Age 13)

Episode list

Reception
Las Vegas and Aspen, playgrounds of the rich and famous and powerful, were two of the settings for the series. Filled with soap opera-like touches, it was far more melodramatic than the original and not as successful critically or in the ratings. The series maintained a popular following in the UK and Europe and was released on a 6-Disc DVD set by Universal-Playback on June 18, 2007. The US DVD set contained both the original mini-series and the weekly series and was released for the first time by A & E Home Video on September 28, 2010.

Awards and nominations

References

External links

1976 American television series debuts
1977 American television series endings
American Broadcasting Company original programming
1970s American drama television series
1970s American television miniseries
Television series by Universal Television
Television shows set in Michigan